Philippe Meunier (born 16 March 1966 in Bron, Rhône) is a former member of the National Assembly of France.  He represented the Rhône department,  and is a member of the Union for a Popular Movement.

References

1966 births
Living people
People from Bron
Union for a Popular Movement politicians
The Popular Right
Deputies of the 13th National Assembly of the French Fifth Republic
Deputies of the 14th National Assembly of the French Fifth Republic
Regional councillors of Auvergne-Rhône-Alpes